Cleven Wanabo (born 7 October 1976) is a Surinamese footballer playing as a forward for Inter Moengotapoe in the Hoofdklasse. He has also played for the Suriname national team.

Career 
Wanabo began his career at Royal '95 in Paramaribo, making his debut in the 2001-02 SVB Hoofdklasse season. He became the league's top goalscorer during the 2004–05 season, and in 2007 transferred to Walking Boyz Company where he played for one year before moving to Inter Moengotapoe winning the national title in 2015.

International career 
Wanabo plays International football for Suriname, having made his debut on 11 October 2008 in the 2010 FIFA World Cup qualification match against Costa Rica which ended in a 4-1 loss. He also participated in the teams' 2008 Caribbean Cup qualification campaign, scoring his first two goals against the Netherlands Antilles in a 2-1 win on 25 October 2008.

Career statistics

International performance
Statistics accurate as of matches played on 16 June 2015,

International goals
Scores and results list Suriname' goal tally first.

Honors

Club
Inter Moengotapoe	
 SVB Hoofdklasse (1): 2014–15

Individual
SVB Hoofdklasse Top Goalscorer: 2004–05

References

External links 
 

Living people
1976 births
Sportspeople from Paramaribo
Surinamese footballers
Suriname international footballers
SVB Eerste Divisie players
S.V. Walking Boyz Company players
Inter Moengotapoe players
Association football forwards